Kürtüncü is a village in the Musabeyli District, Kilis Province, Turkey. The village had a population of 86 in 2022.

In late 19th century, German orientalist Martin Hartmann listed the village as a settlement of 20 houses inhabited by Turks.

References

Villages in Musabeyli District